Kyo-hwa-so No. 6 Sariwon(사리원 6호 교화소) is a "reeducation camp" in Sariwon, North Hwanghae. It holds roughly 3,500-4,000 prisoners.

See also 
 Human Rights in North Korea
 Prisons in North Korea

References

External links 
  - Overview of North Korean reeducation camps with testimonies and satellite photographs

Concentration camps in North Korea